The Spongiophytaceae are a grouping of early plant-like fossils from the Devonian, named after Spongiophyton.  Its members may or may not be closely related.

References

Devonian plants